The Balete people are a Southern African ethnic group. 

In Botswana they have occupied a permanent territory since around 1780, officially recognized as a tribal reserve in 1909.
They are the only one of eight major tribes that do not belong to the related Tswana people. They still have a traditional Paramount Chief, or Kgôsikgolo. Balete are settled in Southern Botswana villages that include Ramotswa, Gabane, Otse, Metsimotlhabe and Mogobane.

List of chiefs/Kings
Phatlê  (Wa ko Tlhôgô ya Tlou)

Malete

Maphalaolê

Mongatane

Maio

Kgomo

Mokgwê

Marumô
 
Pôwê I a Marumo

1805 Mokgôjwe a Pôwê (acting)

1805–1830 Pôwê II a Mokgôjwe (died c. 1830)

1830–1886 Mokgôsi I a Pôwê

1886–1896 Ikaneng a Mokgôsi

1896–1906 Mokgôsi II 

1906–1917 Baitlotle  (acting)

1917–1937 Seboko I a Mokgôsi

1937–1945 Ketswerebothata a Mokgôsi (acting)

1945–1966 Mokgôsi III a Seboko

1966–1996 Kelemogile a Seboko (Kelemogile Mokgosi) acting

1996–2001 Seboko II a Mokgôsi

2001–2002 Tumelo a Seboko (acting)

2002 - present Mosadi Seboko

Leboko la Balete (The Balete Poem)

September 1, 2012 saw the beginning of a new era for the Balete tribe, as it revived its dormant tradition of male initiation, Bogwera, under the guidance of its first ever female Paramount Chief Mosadi Seboko. Among initiates were five councilors from the South East District Council – two from the Botswana Congress Party, another two from the ruling Botswana Democratic party and one from the Botswana Movement for Democracy. The naming of the new regiment ‘Matsosa ngwao’ (Cultural revivers) by Kgosi Seboko coincided with the annual national cultural day celebrations. The event attracted members of the diplomatic corps from Mozambique, Nigeria, the United States of America, the UK and the Chinese Women's Association.

Sources and references
World Statesmen website on political and administrative entities

References

Sotho-Tswana peoples in South Africa